Albanophilia (literally love for Albania and Albanians) the expression by a non-Albanian person of a strong interest in or appreciation for the Albanian language, Albanian culture, Albanian literature, Albanian history or the Albanian people.

Albanophilia in Europe outside of the Balkans

Sweden 
Johann Erich Thunmann in the 18th century supported the theory of the autochthony of the Albanians and also presented the Illyrian origin theory. Later on Gustav Meyer proved that Albanian language was part of the Indo-European family.

Germany 
In 2001 during the Insurgency in Macedonia the German foreign minister Joschka Fischer declared, that the Albanian question in the Balkans is not solved. Around 1912 Germany and Austria supported an Independent Albania, including cities like Parga, Tetovo and Prishtina.

Albanophilia in Balkans

Montenegro
The Montenegrin Federalist Party was the only party in Montenegro which promoted common Illyrian theory with Albanians. The party's theoretician, Sekula Drljević, promoted ideas of a separate Montenegrin ethnicity (ideas that become more extreme throughout the 1930s), arguing that the Montenegrins were Illyrian. He wrote:Races are communities of blood, whereas people are creatures of history. With their language, the Montenegrin people belong to the Slavic linguistic community. By their blood, however, they belong [to the Dinaric peoples]. According to the contemporary science of European races, [Dinaric] peoples are descended from the Illyrians. Hence, not just the kinship, but the identity of certain cultural forms among the Dinaric peoples, all the way from Albanians to South Tyroleans, who are Germanized Illyrians.

Notable Albanophiles
 Nicolae Iorga - Romanian historian and anthropologist
 Sekula Drljević – Montenegrin politician
 Edith Durham – British artist and anthropologist
 Milan Šufflay – Croatian historian and politician
 Franz Nopcsa von Felső-Szilvás – Hungarian aristocrat

Pro-Albanian political parties
Besa Movement 
Democratic Union for Integration 
Democratic Party of Albanians 
Alliance for Albanians 
Party for Democratic Prosperity 
Democratic Party 
Social Democratic Party of Switzerland 
Albanian Alternative 
Party of Democratic Action of Sandžak 
Party for Democratic Action 
Liberal Democratic Party 
Workers' Communist Party

References

Admiration of foreign cultures
Albanian culture